This is the discography of Northern Irish rock band the Undertones.

Albums

Studio albums

Compilation albums

Box sets

Video albums

EPs

Singles

Notes

References

Discographies of British artists
Discographies of Irish artists 
Rock music group discographies
Punk rock discographies